The 2017 Elite One is the 57th season of the Cameroon top-tier football league. The season began on 25 February 2017. UMS de Loum are the defending champions coming off their first league title.

Teams locations

Elite One consists of 18 teams for the 2017 season with three clubs relegated to Elite Two and three promoted. Botafogo, Cosmos de Bafia and Panthère were all relegated to Elite Two after finishing in the last three spots of the 2015 season. Colombe, Feutcheu and Stade Renard were each promoted from Elite Two.

League table

Positions by round

References

Elite One seasons
Cam
Cam
1